Dutherius is a 3rd-century Early Church saint, martyr and bishop of Nice

His feast day is celebrated on 5 December.

References

Gallo-Roman saints
3rd-century Christian martyrs
Year of birth unknown
3rd-century bishops in Gaul
3rd-century Christian saints
Bishops of Nice